Jeanette Spassova (Bulgarian: Жанет Спасова, born 27 January 1962) is a Bulgarian-German actress.

Life and career 
The daughter of actor and general theatre administrator Vassil Spassov and his wife Teresa Azaryan (sister of director Krikor Azaryan), Spassova grew up in Sofia. She attended the Galabov Gymnasium, a German-language secondary school in Sofia, and then studied drama at the Krastyo Sarafov National Academy for Theatre and Film Arts. While still a student she met author and director Ivan Stanev. She was one of the founder members of Stanev's first theatre company, and together they developed their own special language for theatre. This provoked a fierce reaction from the board of censors in Bulgaria, an Eastern Bloc state at the time, and led to Stanev being temporarily barred from exercising his profession

In 1987 Spassova was engaged by the State theatre “ Sofia” in Sofia, where she made her debut in the role of Marie in Stanev's production Die Wunde Woyzeck. In 1988 Heiner Müller invited the company to stage the production in West Berlin. After this guest performance, which formed part of the Heiner-Müller Werkschau, Stanev did not return to Bulgaria. In 1989 he invited Spassova to Munich, where she played the leading role in Stanev's collage Betrogen/Gestern nach einem sonnigen Nachmittag at the Studiotheater Munich.
In 1990 Spassova moved to Berlin, founded an international theatre company with Stanev and performed at the Hebbel Theater and the Podewil.

In 1996 she signed on with the Volksbühne am Rosa-Luxemburg-Platz and until 2000 performed there in numerous productions by Frank Castorf, Christoph Marthaler and Penelope Wehrli, among others. She went on to work as a free-lance actress in Basel (Theater Basel), Munich (Münchner Kammerspiele) and Salzburg (Salzburger Festspiele) and continued to work with Ivan Stanev and his ensemble in Berlin and France.

In 2004 she returned to the Volksbühne in Berlin and until 2017 remained there as a permanent member of the company.
In addition to her work in theatre, Spassova has also played parts in many radio plays and audio books.

Her first roles as a film actress were in Tom Toelle's Bismarck, Stanev's Villa dei Misteri and Luxor Las Vegas and in Castorf's Dämonen and Der Idiot.

In 2012 Spassova played the leading role in the Bulgarian feature film "Az sum Ti" (English: "I am You") and received several awards for her performance. In 2013 "Az sum Ti" was screened at the 16th Shanghai International Film Festival.

Work in theatre (selection) 
1989: Betrogen/Gestern an einem sonnigen Nachmittag von Pinter / Müller - Regie: Ivan Stanev
1990: Schuld und Bühne von Ivan Stanev - Regie: Ivan Stanev
1991: Hermaphroditus von Ivan Stanev - Regie: Ivan Stanev
1992: Brüderchen und Schwesterchen von Ivan Stanev - Regie: Ivan Stanev
1993: Die Mutter von Witkiewitch - Regie: Peter Staatsmann
1995: Die Möwe von Tschechow - Regie: Ivan Stanev
1996: Hochzeitsreise von Sorokin - Regie: Frank Castorf
1996: Anne Sexton - Regie: Penelope. Wehrli
1997: Des Teufels General von Zuckmeyer - Regie: Frank Castorf
1998: Sprechen/Schweigen nach  Ionesco, Wittgenstein - Regie: Ivan Stanev
1998: Good night, Ladies nach Schakespeare - Regie: Ivan Stanev
1999: Don Juan im Kumpelnest 2000 von Ivan Stanev - Regie: Ivan Stanev
1999: Dämonen von  Dostojewski - Regie: Frank Castorf
2000: Le Bleu du ciel von George Bataille - Regie: Ivan Stanev
2001: Erniedrigte und Beleidigte von  Dostojewski - Regie: Frank Castorf
2001: Macbeth von Schakespeare - Regie: Calixto Bieito
2001: Glaube, Liebe, Hoffnung von  Horvath - Regie: Albrecht Hirche
2002: Der Idiot von Dostojewski - Regie: Frank Castorf
2002: Luxor Las Vegas von Ivan Stanev - Regie: Ivan Stanev
2004: Kokain von  Pitigrilli - Regie: Frank Castorf
2004: Meine Schneekönigin von Andersen - Regie: Frank Castorf
2004: Hollywood forever von Ivan Stanev - Regie: Ivan Stanev
2005: Schuld und Sühne von Dostojewski - Regie: Frank Castorf
2006: Im Dickicht der Städte von Brecht - Regie: Frank Castorf
2007: De Frau - Regie:  Jonathan Meese
2008: Maßnahme/Mauser von Brecht, Müller - Regie: Frank Castorf
2008: Kean von Dumas - Regie: Frank Castorf
2009: Mord im Burgtheater von Ivan Stanev - Regie: Ivan Stanev
2010: Nach Moskau, nach Moskau von Tschechow - Regie: Frank Castorf
2012: Fucking Liberty von Ulli Lommel - Regie: Ulli Lommel
2014: "Bitte bei TOTLEBEN klingeln" - Text, Regie: Ivan Stanev
2015: "Kaputt" von Malaparte - Regie Frank Castorf
2015: "Verbrennung" von Wajdi Mouawad - Regie Carolin Mylord
2016: "Locus Solus" von Raymond Roussel - Regie Christof Garbaczewski
2017: "Die Reise nach Petuschki" von Wenedikt Jerofeev,Volksbühne Berlin - Regie: S.Klink 
2017: "Scherzo di Follia", freie Theaterproduktion Berlin - Text und Regie: Ivan Stanev
2017: "Das Milleu der Toten", Stimme, Produktion: Mobile Akademie, Theater der Welt
2018: "Liberté", Volksbühne Berlin; Text, Regie: Albert Serra
2018: "Place Fantôme"", Hauptstadtkulturfonds Berlin; Text, Regie: Ivan Stanev

Radio plays and audio books 
 "Solea" von Izzo - Regie: Ulrich Gerhardt, DLR Kultur 2003
 "Zwei sehr ernsthafte Damen" von Bowles - Regie: Heike Tauch, DLR Kultur,2005
 "Mosaik" von Beyer - Regie: Klaus Buhlert, HR/DLF 2005, Hörspiel des Monats November 2005, Hörspiel des Jahres 2005
 "Stilleben in einem Graben" von Paradino - Regie: Steffen Moratz, MDR, 2006
 "Urfaust" von Goethe - Regie: Leonhard Koppelmann, Hörbuch Argon Verlag, 2007
 "Kurze Geschichte des Traktors auf Ukrainisch" von Levicka -  Regie: Oliver Sturm, MDR Figaro
 "Schöne Aussicht" von  Röhrig - Regie: Götz Fritsch, MDR 2008
 "Ein Held unserer Zeit" von Lermontow, Regie: Oliver Sturm, HR/SWR/DLF 2008
 "Der Mann ohne Eigenschaften" von Robert Musil - Regie: Klaus Buhlert, BR
 "Der Schlafwandler" von Hermann Broch - Regie: Klaus Buhlert, BR
 "Der Process" von Franz Kafka - Regie: Klaus Buhlert, BR 2011, Hörspiel des Monats Dezember, 2010
 "Galaveranstaltung" von David Mairowitz - Regie David Mairowitz, RBB 2016
 "Das Ende der Paraden" von Ford Madox Ford - Regie: Klaus Buhlert, BR 2017

Filmography (selection) 
 Bismarck - Regie: Tom Toelle
 "Villa dei Misteri" - Buch, Regie: Ivan Stanev
 "Luxor Las Vegas" - Buch, Regie: Ivan Stanev
 "Dämonen" von Dostojewski - Regie: Frank Castorf, 2000
 "Der Idiot" von Dostojewski - Regie: Frank Castorf, 2002
 "Az sum ti" (" I am You")  - Regie: Petar Popzlatev, 2012
 "Moghen Paris" - Regie Katharina Copony, 2016
  "Kundschafter des Friedens" - Robert Thalheim, 2017
 "Rabiye Kurnaz gegen George W. Bush" - Regie Andreas Dresen, 2020
 "Das Privileg" - Regie Katharina Schöne und Felix Fuchssteiner, 2021
 "Tatort - Macht der Familie" - Regie Niki Stein, 2021

Awards 
 Golden Rose (Zlatna Rosa), Varna 2012
 Bulgarian Film Academy, Best Actress 2012

External links 

 Kerstin Decker: Ein Land, wo Apfelsinen blühten, Der Tagesspiegel vom 23. April 2005
 PLACE FANTÔME, La Castiglione: Jeanette Spassova. Written and Directed by Ivan Stanev

References

German stage actresses
German film actresses
1962 births
Living people
Actors from Plovdiv
Bulgarian emigrants to Germany
German people of Armenian descent